The Maginnis Irrigation Aqueduct, in rural Kimball County, Nebraska about five miles from Kimball, was built in 1912 by Patrick Maginnis. It was part of the Bay State Irrigation Canal.

It was listed on the National Register of Historic Places in 1994.  It was deemed significant for association with irrigation and agriculture in the state and "as an excellent example of a structure designed to overcome a topographical obstruction", namely a draw of Lodgepole Creek.  In 1994, it was "the best preserved and most visible" of several surviving aqueduct sections in the area.

References

External links 
The Flumes - City of Kimball
More photos of the Maginnis Aqueduct at Wikimedia Commons

Buildings and structures on the National Register of Historic Places in Nebraska
Buildings and structures completed in 1912
Buildings and structures in Kimball County, Nebraska
Water supply infrastructure on the National Register of Historic Places
Tourist attractions in Kimball County, Nebraska
1912 establishments in Nebraska
National Register of Historic Places in Kimball County, Nebraska